The 51st New Brunswick Legislative Assembly was created following a general election in 1987. It was dissolved on August 22, 1991.

Leadership

The speaker was Frank Branch.

Premier Frank McKenna led the government. The Liberal Party won all the seats; but to ensure the proper functioning of the parliamentary system, Frank McKenna named several members of his own caucus, led by Camille Thériault, to serve as the Official Opposition. The government also allowed the Progressive Conservative Party, which finished second place in the election in the number of votes received, to submit written questions to ministers during Question Period.

Members

All were elected in the 31st general election held on October 13, 1987, except for Denis Losier, who was elected in a by-election held after Doug Young resigned his seat.

List of Members 

Italics denotes a party leader
† denotes the Speaker

See also
1987 New Brunswick general election
Legislative Assembly of New Brunswick

References 
 Elections in New Brunswick 1984–2006, Elections New Brunswick (pdf)

Terms of the New Brunswick Legislature
1987 establishments in New Brunswick
1991 disestablishments in New Brunswick
20th century in New Brunswick